Nie Aoshuang (born 16 January 1995) is a Chinese footballer currently playing as a midfielder for Chinese Super League club Wuhan.

Club career
Nie Aoshuang would play for the Wuhan Zall youth team before being sent to France to study with the FC Sochaux-Montbéliard football team for three months. On his return he would be promoted to the senior team and go on to be a squad player before signing a new contract with the club on 1 July 2016. He would go on to score his first goal for the club on 4 April 2018 in a league game against Liaoning F.C. that ended in a 4-0 victory. He would go on to aid the team to promotion to the top tier by winning the 2018 China League One division. On 1 December 2019, Nie would make his Chinese Super League debut against Hebei China Fortune F.C. in a 2-1 defeat.

On 16 July 2020, Nie signed for fellow top tier club Shenzhen, however he was immediately loaned out to third tier football club Wuhan Three Towns F.C. for the 2020 China League Two season. At Wuhan Three Towns he immediately established himself as a vital member of the team and go on to win promotion and the division title with the club.

Career statistics

Honours

Club
Wuhan Zall
 China League One: 2018

Wuhan Three Towns F.C.
 China League One: 2021
 China League Two: 2020

References

External links

1995 births
Living people
Chinese footballers
China youth international footballers
Association football midfielders
China League One players
Chinese Super League players
China League Two players
Wuhan F.C. players
Shenzhen F.C. players
Wuhan Three Towns F.C. players